Astrid Hitland Johannessen (born 10 January 1978) is a Norwegian former footballer who played as a goalkeeper for the Norway women's national football team.

She was understudy to Bente Nordby on the Norwegian team that hosted UEFA Women's Euro 1997 and then finished fourth at the 1999 FIFA Women's World Cup in the United States.

Johannessen won the Toppserien league with her club Asker in 1998 and 1999. She signed for professional English club Fulham in August 2001, agreeing to join in an initial loan deal after the 2001 Norwegian season. Fulham won the treble in season 2002–03, but Johannessen and several other players then left when the women's team lost its professional status.

In August 2010 Johannessen kept goal for Amazon Grimstad in their 4–1 Cup quarter-final defeat by Røa IL.

References

External links
 
 

1978 births
Living people
Norwegian women's footballers
Norway women's international footballers
Arna-Bjørnar players
Fulham L.F.C. players
FA Women's National League players
Toppserien players
IF Fløya players
Asker Fotball (women) players
SK Brann Kvinner players
Amazon Grimstad players
Norwegian expatriate women's footballers
Norwegian expatriate sportspeople in England
Expatriate women's footballers in England
1999 FIFA Women's World Cup players
Women's association football goalkeepers